Children of the Bride is a 1990 American drama television film directed by Jonathan Sanger and starring Rue McClanahan, Kristy McNichol, Jack Coleman, Anne Bobby, Conor O'Farrell and Patrick Duffy. The film premiered on CBS on October 5, 1990 and was released on DVD in 2003. The film was followed by two sequels: Baby of the Bride (1991) and Mother of the Bride (1993).

Plot
Margret Becker (McClanahan) has a big surprise for her now adult children – she is getting remarried – and she also has a second big surprise – her new husband John (Duffy) is young enough to be her son. Although Margret has found new love in her life, the family is in a ruckus. Her children want to help their mother celebrate her new marriage, but instead find themselves wildly uncomfortable with their future stepfather and, as the big day approaches, Margret learns that her first chance at a second start may be her children's last straw.

Cast
Rue McClanahan - Margret Becker
Kristy McNichol - Mary
Jack Coleman - Dennis Becker
Anne Bobby - Anne
Conor O'Farrell - Andrew Becker
Patrick Duffy - John Hix
Beverley Mitchell - Jersey Becker
 Casey Wallace - Amy Becker

References

External links

1990 television films
1990 films
1990 drama films
1990s English-language films
CBS network films
Films about weddings
American drama television films
1990s American films